Chrome Hill is a jazz quartet from Oslo, Norway, originating from the Norwegian Academy of Music. The band changed its name from Damp with the release of the album Earthlings in 2008. Chrome Hill has played in Norway, Sweden, England, France, Portugal and Japan.

Music

In 2008 the album Earthlings was released under the band name Chrome Hill. Along with the change of name, came also a change of style. The music was no longer acoustic, with Asbjørn Lerheim's use of electric and baritone guitars, and clearly inspired by Americana and noise rock. The album was released by the Norwegian record label Bolage. The band released the album Country of Lost Borders in 2013, also on Bolage. In 2018 the band released The Explorer on Clean Feed Records.

Crew
Asbjørn Lerheim, guitar, baritone guitar, electric guitar. Lerheim has his background from jazz and improvisation studies at the Norwegian Academy of Music in Oslo. He also plays in duo with Lisa Dillan.

Torstein Lofthus, drums. He has participated on many jazz, soul and pop albums, and is a frequently used session drummer. He plays regularly in Red Kite and Elephant 9.

Atle Nymo, alto sax, bass clarinet. Nymo has his background from jazzlinja, NTNU and Norwegian Academy of Music. He plays regularly in I.P.A. and Atle Nymo Trio.

Roger Arntzen, bass, double bass. Arntzen is the bass player in the piano trio In the country, who were chosen as the "Young jazz Musicians Of The Year 2004" at Molde International Jazz Festival. This trio has released several albums on Rune Grammofon to much acclaim.

Past members: 
Jørgen Munkeby, alto sax, clarinet. Munkeby is to be heard on a few Norwegian records, and is the leader of the highly acclaimed avant-prog quartet Shining. Munkeby was also one of the founding members of the nu-jazz band Jaga Jazzist, of which he was a member until 2002.

Awards

In August 2001, Damp represented Norway at the Tremplin Jazz d'Avignon festival in Avignon, France, as one of the four bands from Europe. Jørgen Munkeby was awarded the soloist prize.

Discography
Earthlings, 2008
Country of Lost Borders, 2013
The Explorer, 2018
This is Chrome Hill, 2020

References

External links

 Chrome Hill's official website

Norwegian jazz ensembles
Norwegian rock music groups
Noise rock groups
Jazzland Recordings (1997) artists
Musical quartets
Musical groups established in 2000
2000 establishments in Norway
Musical groups from Oslo